Ulrich Raulff (born 13 February 1950 as Ulrich Raulf near Meinerzhagen) is a German cultural scientist and journalist.

Early life
Raulff studied English, philosophy and history at Marburg University, gaining his doctorate under the philosopher  in October 1977.

Career
After changing his name to Raulff, Raulf became a habilitation at the Humboldt University of Berlin in 1995 in cultural studies. Since 1994 he was feuilleton-Redakteur for the Frankfurter Allgemeine Zeitung, since 1997 head of department and from 2001 a senior editor with the features section of the Süddeutsche Zeitung. In 1979, he was one of the founders of the magazine Tumult. He researches and publishes on Marc Bloch, Aby Warburg and the George Circle.

Raulff is a member of the foundation board of the Stefan George Foundation. He is a member of the PEN Centre Germany and since 2007 the German Academy for Language and Literature in Darmstadt.

Prizes
For his study circle without a master, in which he studied the history of the George circle after the death of Stefan Georges in 1933, Raulff received the  Leipzig Book Fair Prize 2010 in the category "Non-fiction and essayistics".
In 1998, he was awarded the Science Prize of the Aby-Warburg Foundation, 2013 with the Ernst Robert Curtius Prize.
In 2013, he received the first-class merit of the Order of Merit of the Federal Republic of Germany.

Bibliography

Critical studies and reviews of Raulff's work
 Review of Farewell to the horse.

German male journalists
German newspaper journalists
20th-century German journalists
21st-century German journalists
20th-century German historians
21st-century German historians
Living people
1950 births
Frankfurter Allgemeine Zeitung people